Pseudantheraea is a genus of moths in the family Saturniidae first described by Weymer in 1892.

Species
Pseudantheraea discrepans (Butler, 1878)
Pseudantheraea imperator Rougeot, 1962

External links

Saturniinae